Twenty8k is a 2012 British thriller film directed by David Kew and Neil Thompson and starring Parminder Nagra, Jonas Armstrong, and Stephen Dillane.

Synopsis
In East London, during the lead up to the Olympics, a teenage boy is gunned down outside a nightclub and a young girl dies in a hit and run in two seemingly unrelated deaths. Deeva Jani, a Paris-based fashion executive, returns home to clear her brother Vipon of the shooting and soon discovers a much deeper conspiracy.

Cast
 Parminder Nagra as Deeva Jani
 Jonas Armstrong as Clint O'Connor
 Nichola Burley as Andrea Patterson
 Kaya Scodelario as Sally Weaver
 Michael Socha as Tony Marchetto
 Kierston Wareing as Francesca Marchetto
 Stephen Dillane as DCI Edward Stone
 Nathalie Emmanuel as Carla
 Sebastian Nanena as Vipon Jani

References

External links

2012 films
2012 thriller films
British thriller films
Films shot in England
Films set in London
2010s English-language films
2010s British films